Hebestatis theveneti is a species of cork-lid trapdoor spider in the family Halonoproctidae. It is found in the United States.

References

Halonoproctidae
Articles created by Qbugbot
Spiders described in 1891
Spiders of the United States